Mongolia participated in the 2010 Asian Para Games–First Asian Para Games in Guangzhou, China from 13 to 19 December 2010. Athletes from Mongolia won five medals, and finished at the 24th spot in a medal table.

References

Nations at the 2010 Asian Para Games
2010 in Mongolian sport
Mongolia at the Asian Para Games